is a Japanese footballer currently playing as a defender for Kataller Toyama.

Club career
While studying at the Toyo University, Kamiyama was announced as a Kataller Toyama player ahead of the 2022 season.

Career statistics

Club
.

Notes

References

2000 births
Living people
Association football people from Kanagawa Prefecture
Toyo University alumni
Japanese footballers
Japan youth international footballers
Association football defenders
J3 League players
Yokohama FC players
Kataller Toyama players